Sinjoro is a taluka, an administrative subdivision, of Sanghar District, Sindh, Pakistan. It is nearer to Sanghar then other Tehsils. The people are mainly Sindhi.

Most of the people are involved in agriculture and livestock, the Sindhi people are predominantly involved in cultivation whilst and retail shops in the city.

Administration
The taluka is administratively subdivided into 8 Union Councils, these are:

 U.C 35 Pritamabad
 U.C 36 Kurkali
 U.C 37 Jaffar Khan Leghari
 U.C 38 Jhol
 U.C 39 Sinjhoro
 U.C 40 Shahmardanabad
 U.C 41 Khadro
 U.C 42 P.S.S.S Shaheed

References

Populated places in Sanghar District